Danil Takhirovich Khalimov (6 July 1978 – 15 October 2020) was a Russian-Kazakhstani amateur  Greco-Roman wrestler of Tatar descent, who competed in the men's middleweight category.

Career
He won two silver medals each in the 74 kg division at the 2002 Asian Games in Busan, South Korea, and at the 2004 Asian Wrestling Championships in Almaty, and later scored a fifth-place finish at the Summer Olympics in Athens, representing Kazakhstan. Khalimov also trained full-time for Professional Sport Club Daulet in Almaty, under his personal coach Anvar Sagitov.

Khalimov was born in Nizhny Tagil, Russian SFSR. He qualified for his naturalized Kazakh squad in the men's 74 kg class at the 2004 Summer Olympics in Athens. Earlier in the process, he finished fourth from the 2003 World Wrestling Championships in Créteil, France, and then captured the silver medal at the Asian Championships to guarantee a spot on the Kazakh wrestling team. He ousted Georgian-born wrestler Yasha Manasherov of Israel in his opening match by a quick 8–0 margin, and then brushed aside Olympic veteran José Alberto Recuero of Spain with a tough 3–2 decision in the prelim pool to secure his place for the next round of the competition. Khalimov lost in overtime to Switzerland's Reto Bucher in the quarterfinal match at 0–3, but easily scored a triumph in a fifth-place playoff against two-time Olympic champion Filiberto Azcuy of Cuba, who withdrew from the tournament because of an injury.

Khalimov died from COVID-19 on 15 October 2020, at the age of 42 during the COVID-19 pandemic in Russia.

References

External links
 Profile – International Wrestling Database

1978 births
2020 deaths
Tatar people of Russia
Volga Tatar people
Tatar sportspeople
Olympic wrestlers of Kazakhstan
Wrestlers at the 2004 Summer Olympics
Wrestlers at the 2002 Asian Games
Asian Games medalists in wrestling
Place of death missing
Russian emigrants to Kazakhstan
Naturalised citizens of Kazakhstan
People from Nizhny Tagil
Kazakhstani male sport wrestlers
Asian Games silver medalists for Kazakhstan
Medalists at the 2002 Asian Games
Deaths from the COVID-19 pandemic in Russia
Sportspeople from Sverdlovsk Oblast